The Santhal rebellion (also known as the Sonthal rebellion or the Santhal Hool), was a rebellion in present-day Jharkhand and 
West Bengal , Eastern India against both the British East India Company (BEIC) and zamindari system by the Santhal. It started on June 30, 1855 and on November 10, 1855, martial law was proclaimed by the East India Company which lasted until January 3, 1856 when martial law was suspended and the rebellion was eventually suppressed by the Presidency armies. The rebellion was led by the four sibling Brothers - Sidhu, Kanhu, Chand and Bhairav.

Background
The rebellion of the Santhals began as a reaction to end the revenue system of the British East India Company (BEIC), usury practices, and the zamindari system in India; in the tribal belt of what was then known as the Bengal Presidency. It was a revolt against the oppression of the colonial rule propagated through a distorted revenue system, enforced by the local zamindars, the police and the courts of the legal system set up by the British East India Company.

The Santhals lived in and depended on forests. In 1832, the BEIC demarcated the Damin-i-koh region in present day Jharkhand and invited Santhals to settle in the region. Due to promises of land and economic amenities a large numbers of Santhals came to settle from Dhalbhum, Manbhum, Hazaribagh, Midnapore etc. Soon, Mahajans zamindars, as tax-collecting intermediaries employed by the BEIC, dominated the economy. Many Santals became victims of corrupt money lending practices. They were lent money at exorbitant rates. When they were unable to repay the loan, their lands were forcibly taken and they were forced into bonded labour. This sparked the Santal rebellion by Sidhu and Kanhu Murmu, two brothers who led the Santals during the rebellion.

Rebellion
On 30 June 1855, two Santal rebel leaders, Sidhu and Kanhu Murmu, mobilized roughly 60,000 Santhals and declared a rebellion against the East India Company. Sidhu Murmu had accumulated about ten thousand Santhals to run a parallel government during the rebellion. The basic purpose was to collect taxes by making and enforcing his own laws.

Soon after the declaration, the Santhals took to arms. In many villages, the Zamindars, money lenders, and their operatives were executed. The open rebellion caught the Company administration by surprise. Initially, a small contingent was sent to suppress the rebels but they were unsuccessful and this further fueled the spirit of the revolt. When the law and order situation was getting out of hand, the Company administration finally took a major step and sent in a large number of troops assisted by the local Zamindars and the Nawab of Murshidabad to quell the Rebellion. The East India Company announced an bounty of Rs. 10,000 to arrest Sidhu and his brother Kanhu Murmu.

A number of skirmishes occurred after this which resulted in a large number of casualties for the Santhal forces. The primitive weapons of the Santhals proved to be unable to match the gunpowder weapons of the East India Company military. Troop detachments from the 7th Native Infantry Regiment, 40th Native Infantry, and others were called into action. Major skirmishes occurred from July 1855 to January 1856, in places like Kahalgaon, Suri, Raghunathpur, and Munkatora.

The revolt was eventually suppressed after Sidhu and Kanhu were killed in action. War elephants, supplied by the Nawab of Murshidabad, were used to demolish Santhal huts during the rebellion. In this event over 15,000 were killed, tens of villages were destroyed and many were mobilized during the rebellion.

During the rebellion, the Santhal leader was able to mobilize roughly 60,000 Santhal forming groups, with 1500 to 2000 people forming a group. The rebellion is supported by poor tribals and non-tribals like Gowalas and Lohars (who were milkmen and blacksmiths) in the form of providing information and weapons. Ranabir Samaddar argues that apart from Santhals, other aboriginal inhabitants of the region like Mahatos, Kamars, Bagdis, Bagals and others also participated in the rebellion. The Mahatos were participated under leadership of Chanku Mahato.

Legacy 
English author Charles Dickens, in Household Words, wrote the following passage on the rebellion:

<blockquote> There seems also to be a sentiment of honor among them; for it is said that they use poisoned arrows in hunting, but never against their foes. If this be the case and we hear nothing of the poisoned arrows in the recent conflicts, they are infinitely more respectable than our civilized enemy, the Russians, who would most likely consider such forbearance as foolish, and declare that is not war."</blockquote>

Mrinal Sen's film Mrigayaa'' (1976) is set during the Santhal rebellion

See also 
 Kol uprising
 Bastar rebellion

References

Bibliography

Further reading

External links

Rebellions in India
History of Jharkhand
Conflicts in 1855